Drew Baldridge (born 1992) is an American country music singer and songwriter. He has issued several independent singles via Cold River Records, and has charted several times on Country Airplay.

Biography
Drew Baldridge was born in Patoka, Illinois in 1992. He began performing in local talent contests as a teenager, and moved to Nashville, Tennessee at age 18 to pursue a career in country music. Baldridge released a pair of extended plays digitally between 2014 and 2015. Later on, he released the single "Dance with Ya", which was officially sent to radio and became his first chart entry on Country Airplay. A full studio album, Dirt on Us, came by year's end. In promotion of the album, Baldridge toured with Lee Brice and Cole Swindell.

Baldridge announced a new single, "Guns & Roses", at the end of 2017. The song is intended to be the lead single to his second studio album.

He married  Katherine Kraus in May 2021. They announced that they are expecting their first child on 2022 .

Discography

Studio albums

Compilation albums
 Crossing Country Lines (Deluxe Edition) (2015)

Extended plays

Singles

Music videos

References

1992 births
American country singer-songwriters
American male singer-songwriters
Living people
People from Marion County, Illinois
Musicians from Nashville, Tennessee
Country musicians from Tennessee
Country musicians from Illinois
21st-century American male singers
21st-century American singers
Singer-songwriters from Tennessee
Singer-songwriters from Illinois